María Constanza Ceruti (born 11 January 1973 in Buenos Aires, Argentina) is an anthropologist and mountaineer from Argentina, who has done more than 80 field surveys, most of them as part of National Geographic teams in Andean regions of Argentina, Chile, Bolivia, Ecuador and Peru. Her most important finding are the Children of Llullaillaco, considered the best preserved mummies in the world by the Guinness World Records. She is also the first woman worldwide to specialize in high-altitude archaeology, studying Inca ceremonial centers on the summits of Andean peaks above 6000 meters.  She is a pioneer in the anthropological study of sacred mountains around the world, and in the emerging field of glacial archaeology.

She is a scientific researcher in the National Scientific and Technical Research Council (CONICET) of Argentina, founder and director pro bono of the Institute of High Mountain Research and a professor of Inca Archaeology at the Catholic University of Salta (UCASAL).

Ceruti is the first woman to specialize in the field of high-altitude archaeology. As an archaeologist, she has excavated Inca Empire ceremonial centers on the summits of the Andes. As an anthropologist, she has been studying hundreds of sacred mountains in diverse parts of the world, looking at their role in religion, mythology, folklore, identity and tourism.

She has done more than 80 field surveys, many with National Geographic teams in Argentina, Chile, Bolivia, Ecuador and Peru. 
Much of her research takes place on sites that have never been explored before.

She has conducted research on sacred mountains and the world´s religions in the Nepal Himalayas, India, Thailand, Australia, New Zealand, Hawai, Egypt, Morocco, Turkey, Greece, Croacia, Norway, Italy, France, Spain, Ireland, Scotland, England, Greenland, Canada, Alaska, United States, Mexico, Costa Rica, Ecuador, Brazil, Peru and Chile. Her work has significant impact in many areas of research.

Education 
Born in the city of Buenos Aires on 11 January 1973, Constanza Ceruti studied in the University of Buenos Aires, graduating with the university's Gold Medal and a degree in anthropology in 1996. 
In October 2001 she earned her doctorate cum laude at the National University of Cuyo, the first person to specialize in high altitude archeology.

Career 
Ceruti is a Professor of Incan Archaeology at the Catholic University of Salta (UCASAL), as well as the founder and ad-honorem director of the Institute of High Mountain Investigations of the Catholic University of Salta. She is also a researcher of the National Council for Scientific Research in Argentina (CONICET)., and member of the National Academy of Sciences of Buenos Aires (ANCBA), the Argentina Society of Anthropology (Sociedad Argentina de Antropologia), the Association of Professional Archaeologists of Argentina (Colegio de Graduados de Antropología), the Society for American Archaeology, The Explorers Club in New York, and the Society of Woman Geographers.

She has climbed more than a hundred mountains reaching above  during her research.
the Llullaillaco volcano in 1999, 
the snow-capped Cachi  in 1996 and 1997
and Quehuar in 1996 and 1999.

She has published 25 books, four of them on High Mountain archeology in the Andes, and more than 100 scientific papers.

Research 
The work Ceruti does at high altitudes is exceptionally dangerous.

The remains of six human sacrifices older than 500 years of antiquity were examined.

In 1999 Ceruti co-lead four archaeological expeditions with Johan Reinhard in the Andes mountains.
There investigators recovered the remains of a mummified child, whose gravesite had been blasted open with dynamite and looted of ceremonial objects by treasure hunters. Researchers carefully salvaged the pieces of the body, which had been left scattered on the mountaintop.

Children of Llullaillaco

A few weeks later Ceruti, Reinhard, and a team from National Geographic ascended the Llullaillaco volcano  in the Argentine province of Salta. During an extended high-altitude excavation period, they found and studied the intact mummies of three Incan children, a boy and two girls. The bodies were accompanied by dozens of sumptuous objects of typical Inca style, including ceramic  vessels, wooden  cups, woven bags, spondylus  shells, sandals, moccasins, clothing, jewelry, and female figurine  miniatures. 
These mummies are considered some of the better preserved mummies  of the world.
The Museum of High Mountain Archeology of Salta (MAAM) has been built to provide a home for them.

For six years, Ceruti and others at UCASAL scientifically studied the mummified bodies of the three Inca children of Llullaillaco in an international collaboration. 
They were able to determine the general lifestyle, ages, and causes of death of the children. The youngest, a girl, died at age six of pulmonary edema as a result of the high altitude.  After her death, her mummy was struck by lightning.  
The second youngest, a boy, died at age seven due to exposure to cold. The oldest, a fifteen-year-old girl, died also died of exposure. DNA analysis showed that they were not related. Ceruti's notes from the original sites, painstakingly compiled under extreme conditions, have enabled researchers to better understand the ceremonial and political implications of the capacocha ritual.

The children were in good health before their deaths, and had not suffered from malnutrition, suggested they were from high-status families. Analysis of their hair revealed that all three had eaten an enriched corn-based diet during their last year of life, including coca leaves, which can be eaten to counteract high-altitude sickness. Their clothing and artifacts indicate that they came originally from Cuzco, Peru, thousands of miles away, requiring a journey of months to reach the high Andes where they died.

Her discovery is narrated in her biography written by Gloria Lisé Donde el cielo besa la tierra Biografía de Constanza Ceruti la Arqueóloga de Alta Montaña que descubrió las Momias del Llullaillaco.

Pucará de Tilcara
After receiving her doctorate in 2001, Ceruti lived for five years in  an adobe house near Pucará de Tilcara, Pucará de Tilcara is a fortification built around the twelfth century A.D. by ancestors of the Omaguaca people. By the fourteenth century, it was an important administrative, military and religious center. The area was conquered by the Incas, and a few decades later by the Spanish, who arrived in 1536. People continue to make pilgrimages from the village to nearby mountain shrines. Living there enabled Ceruti to become deeply aware of village life and its connections to pre-Incan and Incan traditions.

Bibliography

Published books

 2019, Montañas Sagradas de Noruega.  Mundo Editorial. Salta. Noviembre 2019. 
 2018, Montañas Sagradas de los Pirineos.  Mundo Editorial. Salta. 
 2017, Montañas Sagradas de Escocia.  Mundo Editorial. Salta. 
 2016, Procesiones andinas en alta montaña. Peregrinaje a cerros sagrados del norte de Argentina y el sur de Perú.  EUCASA. Salta. 
 2016, Sacred Mountains in the Canary Islands.  Mundo Editorial. Salta. 
 2016, Montañas Sagradas de Irlanda.  Mundo Editorial. Salta. 
 2016, Sacred Mountains in Australia.  Mundo Editorial. Salta. 
 2016, Montañas Místicas: poemas y vivencias de una mujer andinista.  Mundo Editorial. Salta. 
 2015, El Camino de Santiago y las Montañas Sagradas de Galicia.  Mundo Editorial. Salta.  Enero 2015. 138 páginas.
 2015, Volcanes Sagrados en Costa Rica.  Mundo Editorial. Salta. 
 2015, Montañas Sagradas en el País Vasco.  Mundo Editorial. Salta 
 2015, Llullaillaco: Sacrificios y Ofrendas en un Santuario Inca de Alta Montaña.  Mundo Editorial. Salta. 
 2014, Embajadores del Pasado: los niños del Llullaillaco y otras momias del mundo.  Mundo Editorial. Salta. 
 2014, Volcanes Sagrados en Isla de Pascua.  Mundo Editorial. Salta. 
 2014, Seasons of the Heart, Landscapes of the Soul.  Mundo Editorial. Salta. 
 2014, Montañas Sagradas de Tailandia.  Mundo Editorial. Salta 
 2014, El Monte Santo del Padre Pío. En las alturas del Gargano.  Mundo Editorial. Salta. 
 2004, Arqueología de Alta Montaña en La Rioja.  Ediciones de la Universidad Católica de Salta. Salta.
 2003, Llullaillaco: Sacrificios y Ofrendas en un Santuario Inca de Alta Montaña.  Publicación del Instituto de Investigaciones de Alta Montaña. Ediciones de la Universidad Católica de Salta. Salta.
 1999, Cumbres Sagradas del Nororeste Argentino.  Editorial de la Universidad de Buenos Aires (EUDEBA). Buenos Aires.
 1997, Arqueología de Alta Montaña. Editorial Milor. Salta.

In collaboration

 2011, Reinhard, Johan and Maria Constanza Ceruti Inca Rituals and Sacred Mountains: a study of the world ́s highest archaeological sites. Cotsen Institute of Archaeology. UCLA. Los Ángeles

Recent papers 
  2018. De momias y sacrificios infantiles: consideraciones para una arqueología de la niñez en Sudamérica. Revista de Arqueología. Vol. 31 (2): 118-133.
 2018. Sasso della Croce: montaña sagrada y religiosidad ladina en las Dolomitas de Val Badia (Alto Adige, Italia). Mitológicas XXXIII: 35-50. Centro Argentino de Etnología Americana.
  2018. De la colina de Wawel a los Altos Tatras: patrimonio, turismo y dimensión sagrada de la montaña en Malopolska (Polonia). Cuadernos Universitarios 11: 95-114. EUCASA. Salta.
  2017/ 2016. Inca mountaintop shrines and glaciers in the High Andes. Journal of Glacial Archaeology Nro. 3 (1): 59-78. Equinox Publishers.
 2017. Contribuciones a los estudios antropológicos de monta ñas sagradas y a la arqueología de altura en Argentina y el mundo. Conference at the National Academy of Sciences in Buenos Aires (ANCBA).
 2017. La Madonnina del Gran Paradiso: alta montaña y patrimonio religioso en la cima de un gigante de los Alpes. Revista Estudios del Patrimonio Cultural Nro. 16: 6-20. España.
 2017. Bonifacio Roero: primer alpinista religioso en la historia europea. Boletín del Centro de Estudios Genealógicos de Salta Nro. 11:271-289. Centro de Investigaciones Genealógicas de Salta. Salta.
  2017. El macizo Catinaccio y el lago de Antermoia: montañas sagradas y mitología ladina en las Dolomitas de Val di Fassa (Alpes del noreste de italia). Scripta Ethnológica XXXIX: 67-85. Centro Argentino de Etnología Americana. Buenos Aires.
  2016. Los Museos de Montaña de Reinhold Messner: Identidad, Turismo y Sustentabilidad en los Alpes de Sud Tirol. Journal of Sustainability Education. Vol 11. Pp. 27. February 2016.
  2016. Yellowstone: paisaje y patrimonio. Revista Estudios del Patrimonio Cultural 15: 40-55. España.
 2016 Los Walsers del Monte Rosa y los carnavales a orillas del lago Bodensee: influencias de ritos y creencias alpinos en la peregrinación andina de Qoyllur Rit ́i. Revista Haucaypata Nro. 11: 14-27. Lima.
  2015. Frozen Mummies from Andean Mountaintop Shrines: Bioarchaeology and Ethnohistory of Inca Human Sacrifice. Journal of Biomedical Research International. Volume 2015. Article ID 439428. 12 pages. Hindawi.
  2015. Nuestra Señora de las Nieves del Monte Zerbion, una devoción mariana en los Alpes. Boletín del Museo Regional de Atacama. Volumen VI Nro. 6:71-81. Copiapó.

Awards and honors
 1997, Mountaineer of the Year (Montañista del Año)
 5 August 2000, the Argentine Army awarded Ceruti its highest mountain distinction, the Golden Condor Honoris Causa (“Cóndor Dorado Honoris Causa of the Ejército Argentino”) for her high altitude experience with over 100 ascents above . It was the first time it was awarded to a woman.
2005, Emerging Explorer, National Geographic Society
2006, Prince of Asturias Award in the Communication and Humanities category, received on behalf of the National Geographic Society by Ceruti, John Fahey, Reza Deghati (Iran), Enric Sala (Spain) and Michael Fay (USA)
2007, WINGS Women of Discovery Award for Courage
 2008, Academic Vocation Award (Vocación Académica), National Conference on Vocation, Training and Employment in the Argentine Republic
 2010, Woman of the Year (Mujer Destacada de Salta), Salta
 2011, Silver Clover Award (Trébol de Plata), Rotary Club of Buenos Aires
 2014, Honorary Doctorate in Humanities, Moravian College, Pennsylvania
 2017, Gold Medal award of the International Society of Woman Geographers (ISWG)
 2019, Member of the National Academy of Sciences of Buenos Aires (ANCBA)

References

External links 
 
 

National University of Cuyo alumni
University of Buenos Aires alumni
Argentine anthropologists
Argentine women anthropologists
Argentine people of Italian descent
Argentine archaeologists
20th-century women scientists
1973 births
People from Buenos Aires
Living people
21st-century women scientists
Members of the Society of Woman Geographers
Argentine women archaeologists

es:Plancton